George Washington Shonk (April 26, 1850 – August 14, 1900) was a Republican member of the U.S. House of Representatives from Pennsylvania.

George W. Shonk was born in Plymouth, Pennsylvania, where he attended the public schools. He studied at Wyoming Seminary in Kingston, Pennsylvania,  and graduated in 1873 from Wesleyan University in Middletown, Connecticut.  He studied law and in 1876 was admitted to the bar of Luzerne County, Pennsylvania, after which he practiced law in Wilkes-Barre, Pennsylvania.

Shonk was elected as a Republican to the Fifty-second Congress.  He declined to be a candidate for renomination in 1892.  He resumed the practice of his profession in Wilkes-Barre, and also became interested in coal mining in Pennsylvania.  He died on a business trip to Washington, D.C. in 1900, and was buried in Shawnee Cemetery, Plymouth, Pennsylvania.

George Washington Shonk married Ida Elizabeth Klotz (1856–1911) on August 11, 1880. They were the parents of New York Assemblyman Herbert B. Shonk (1881–1930), and Emily Weaver Shonk (1885–1974).

Sources

The Political Graveyard

1850 births
1900 deaths
People from Plymouth, Pennsylvania
Shonk, George W.
Wesleyan University alumni
Republican Party members of the United States House of Representatives from Pennsylvania
19th-century American politicians
19th-century American lawyers